Thomas I may refer to:

 Thomas I of Constantinople, Patriarch from 607 to 610
 Thomas I of Jerusalem, Patriarch until 821
 Thomas I of York (died in 1100)
 Thomas I, Count of Savoy  (1178–1233)
 Thomas I d'Autremencourt (died ca. 1212), Lord of Salona
 Thomas I, Archbishop of Esztergom (1224)
 Thomas I of Saluzzo (died in 1296)
 Thomas I Komnenos Doukas  (c. 1285–1318)
 Baselios Thomas I (1929– )